Michael Zimmerman may refer to:

 Michael Zimmerman (biologist) (born 1953), American biologist at Butler University
 Michael Zimmerman (historian) (1951–2007), German historian
 Michael Zimmerman (jurist) (born 1943), Zen teacher and former Utah Supreme Court Chief Justice
 Michael Zimmerman (tennis) (born 1970), American tennis player
 Michael E. Zimmerman (born 1946), philosopher at the University of Colorado at Boulder